Silvertone Records was a record label manufactured for Sears, Roebuck and Co. for sale in their chain of department stores and through mail order.

Silvertone's discs were manufactured 1916–1928, and then revived briefly in 1940–1941. Early releases were single-sided lateral-cut phonograph records; in the late 1910s double-sided discs began to be released. Most discs were manufactured by Columbia Records, while some were made by Paramount Records and Gennett Records. Earlier in the label's history, it was used to supplant its sister label Oxford Records.

See also
 List of record labels
 Silvertone Records (disambiguation)
 Oxford Records, Silvertone's sister label
 Silvertone (brand)

References

External links
 Sears, Roebuck & Company Record Labels (1905-1950)

American record labels
Record labels established in 1916
Record labels disestablished in 1928
Record labels established in 1940
Record labels disestablished in 1941
Re-established companies
Record labels owned by Sears, Roebuck and Company
Jazz record labels